Targarh is a village located in the Punjab province of Pakistan. It is located in Lahore District at 31°36'44N 74°16'51E with an altitude of 197 metres (649 feet), and lies to the north-west of Lahore city.

References

Ravi Zone